Deborah Smith is the New York Times bestselling author of more than 35 novels in romance and women's fiction. Her books include 21 series romances under her real name and under two pen names (Jackie Leigh and Jacquelyn Lennox). Her bigger novels include Miracle, Blue Willow, Silk and Stone, A Place To Call Home, When Venus Fell, On Bear Mountain, Charming Grace, Sweet Hush, The Stone Flower Garden, Alice at Heart, Diary of a Radical Mermaid, The Crossroads Cafe, A Gentle Rain, and Solomon's Seal: Discovery.

A Gentle Rain was a Romance Writers of America RITA finalist in 2008. In 2004 Sweet Hush was optioned for film by the producers of The Princess Diaries.

Smith is also editorial director and a founding partner of BelleBooks, a small press (2000–present) co-owned by Smith, former RWA V.P. Debra Dixon, and veteran authors Sandra Chastain and Martha Shields Crockett. BelleBooks has currently published more than 400 novels and anthologies.

Smith's 2014 novels include The Biscuit Witch and The Pickle Queen, contemporary romances.
Deborah attended Lakeshore High School in College Park Georgia and was an avid horse woman.

References

External links 
 http://www.leighbridger.com
 http://www.bellebooks.com

20th-century American novelists
21st-century American novelists
American romantic fiction writers
Living people
American women novelists
Women romantic fiction writers
20th-century American women writers
21st-century American women writers
Year of birth missing (living people)